Elections to Cannock Chase District Council took place on 6 May 2021 on the same day as the Staffordshire County council election and other local elections in England. These elections were due to take place on 7 May 2020 but were delayed by 12 months due to the coronavirus pandemic. All but two of the council's wards were up for election, meaning a total of 13 councillors were elected.

Before the election, the Labour Party held control of the council with a minority administration supported by an independent councillor (who was elected as Labour) and two Liberal Democrat councillors. They were defending eight seats and hoping to regain another following a defection. The Conservatives were looking to build on modest gains made at the 2018 election to increase the size of their 14-strong group. Since the 2019 election, a new localist party, the Chase Community Independent Group, was created consisting of four former Green Party councillors and one former Labour councillor; they were defending their group leader's Hednesford South seat which he previously won as a Green. The Liberal Democrats were aiming for a third consecutive victory in the Brereton & Ravenhill ward.

The result was a landslide victory for the Conservatives who won all but one of the 13 seats up for election. They gained seats in wards previously considered safe for the Labour Party and gained the first ever Conservative overall majority in Cannock Chase District Council's 48-year history. They also won more than 50% of all votes cast, the first time the Conservatives have achieved this feat on this council and the first time any party has achieved it since the Labour Party racked up 53.6% in 2012.

Results

|}

Council Composition
Prior to the election, the composition of the council was:

After the election, the composition of the council was:

Ward results
Vote share changes are based on the results achieved by parties in 2016 when these seats were last contested.

Brereton and Ravenhill

Cannock East

Cannock North

Cannock South

Cannock West

Etching Hill and the Heath

Hagley

Hawks Green

Heath Hayes East & Wimblebury

Hednesford North

Hednesford South

^ Paul Woodhead was the sitting councillor for the Hednesford South ward and previously defected from the Greens to the newly formed Chase Community Independents Group. Changes to his majority and swing are calculated based on his 2016 result.

Norton Canes

Western Springs

References

Cannock Chase
2021
2020s in Staffordshire
May 2021 events in the United Kingdom